Sampsons Island is a  uninhabited, undeveloped barrier island at the mouth of Cotuit Harbor in Barnstable, Massachusetts. It is the location of the Massachusetts Audubon Society's Sampsons Island Wildlife Sanctuary, and it forms part of the Sampsons Island/Dead Neck Island barrier beach system. The island is only accessible by private boat, and is used for recreation and wildlife viewing and preservation.

As a barrier island, Sampsons Island and Dead Neck Island protect Cotuit Harbor and nearby coastal areas. The island is a nesting site for piping plovers, least terns, and common terns and a habitat for many other shore birds. It is designated an Important Bird Area. Access to the island is limited during nesting season.

References

External links
Sampsons Island Wildlife Sanctuary

Barnstable, Massachusetts
Islands of Barnstable County, Massachusetts
Sampson's Island
Open space reserves of Massachusetts
Coastal islands of Massachusetts
Wildlife refuges in Massachusetts
Massachusetts Audubon Society
Important Bird Areas of the United States
Barrier islands of Massachusetts